The Chinchilla train collision occurred on June 3, 2003, when a passenger train and a freight train collided on the Cartagena-Albacete line in the Castilian-Manchego municipality of Chinchilla de Monte-Aragón, Albacete, Spain. The accident resulted in 19 deaths and around 50 wounded.

Victims
Initially, it was estimated that 16 people were dead (five engineers from the two trains involved) along with 10 missing and 39 wounded. After the rescue, it was found that a total of 19 people were killed and 65 others injured.

Judicial process
Station master José Luis D. C. was convicted in 2006 of 19 counts of professional reckless homicide and 48 counts of professional reckless injury. He was sentenced to two years of prison and four years of absolute disqualification (which disqualifies a convict from holding public office or employment, and disallows a convict to obtain government grants, scholarships, or any public aid).

References

2003 disasters in Spain
2003 in Spain
Train collisions in Spain
Railway accidents in 2003
History of the province of Albacete
July 2003 events in Europe